William Ernest, Duke of Saxe-Weimar (19 October 1662 – 26 August 1728) was a duke of Saxe-Weimar.

Life 
He was born in Weimar, the eldest son of Johann Ernst II, Duke of Saxe-Weimar and Princess Christine Elisabeth of Schleswig-Holstein-Sonderburg.

When his father died in 1683, he succeeded him as duke; however, he was compelled to rule jointly with his younger brother Johann Ernst III.

Because John Ernest III was alcoholic, William Ernest took full control of the government of the duchy and permitted John Ernest the nominal title of co-duke (Mitherr) until his death in 1707. After the death of his brother he made John Ernest's son, Ernest August I, co-duke, but with no real power.

Six months after the death of his father (2 November 1683), William Ernest married in Eisenach with Charlotte Marie, his cousin and eldest surviving daughter of his uncle Bernhard II, Duke of Saxe-Jena, in order to secure the family lands. At that time, the guardian of Charlotte and his younger brother, the duke Johann William of Saxe-Jena, was the duke John George I of Saxe-Eisenach, their only surviving uncle. When he died in 1686, the guardianship of the duke of Saxe-Jena was taken by William Ernest, his cousin and brother-in-law.

William Ernest was a strict Lutheran and commanded that only men who could read and comment on Lutheran theological writings be admitted to his armed forces. The composer Johann Sebastian Bach worked for the duke from 1708, first as organist, then as Konzertmeister (leader of the orchestra) in Weimar. When Johann Samuel Drese died in 1716, Bach solicited his post of Kapellmeister (head of the court musical establishment), but William Ernest appointed Drese's incompetent son for the post instead; furious, Bach solicited his dismissal from the Duke's service. Annoyed at Bach's impertinence, William Ernest had Bach jailed for four weeks in a fortress before he accepted his dismissal.

On 23 August 1690, William Ernest and Charlotte Marie were divorced after seven years of childless and extremely unhappy union. Two months later, on 4 November, duke John William of Saxe-Jena (Charlotte Marie's brother), died without heirs, and Wilhelm Ernst took possession of part of his duchy after a treaty was signed with the Saxe-Eisenach branch of his family.

William Ernest never remarried and died at Weimar without heirs; his nephew Ernest August I became his successor.

Ancestry

References 
 G. Lämmerhirt: Wilhelm Ernst. In: Allgemeine Deutsche Biographie (ADB). Band 43, Duncker & Humblot, Leipzig 1898, S. 195–201.

|-

1662 births
1728 deaths
House of Wettin
Nobility from Weimar
Dukes of Saxe-Weimar